The Ministry of Sport & Youth Affairs of Georgia (sakartvelos sportisa da akhalgazrdobis sakmeta saministro) was a governmental agency within the Cabinet of Georgia in charge of regulating activities related to sports and youth development in Georgia. In December 2017 the ministry was merged with that of Culture to form the Ministry of Culture and Sport.

History
The ministry was established in 2010 as a result of restructuring activities within the Georgian government in June 2010. The preceding Ministry of Culture, Monuments Protection and Sports was split into two separate government agencies: Ministry of Sport and Youth Affairs and Ministry of Culture and Monument Protection. The split was made due to growing importance of sports among youth in Georgia. In 2010, the government allocated GEL 29,236.4 million to the ministry; in 2011 - 30,927.6 million.

See also
Cabinet of Georgia

References

Sport and Youth Affairs
Georgia
Georgia
Georgia, Sport and Youth Affairs
2010 establishments in Georgia (country)
Ministries disestablished in 2017
2017 disestablishments in Georgia (country)